Thaddeus Stevens Smith (May 13, 1847 – March 14, 1933) was a soldier from Pennsylvania who fought in the American Civil War. He received the United States' highest medal for bravery during combat, the Medal of Honor, for his actions during the Battle of Gettysburg 2 July 1863. He was issued the medal on 5 May 1900.

Early life
Smith was born May 13, 1847, in Cumberland, Pennsylvania and was one of six children born to Henry and Elizabeth Smith and one of five boys.

Military service
When the American Civil War broke out, Smith enlisted into Company E, 6th Pennsylvania Reserves (also known as the 35th Pennsylvania Infantry).

Medal of Honor action
On the second day of fighting in the Battle of Gettysburg Union forces had been forced to fall back due to the superior numbers of the opposing Confederate force. As more Union troops arrived to fight however the battle started to shift. In an area known as Devil's Den, Smith, along with J. Levi Roush, John W. Hart, George Mears, Chester S. Furman and Wallace Johnson volunteered to attack a small log cabin being held by Confederate forces. Although they attempted to approach the cabin by stealth, they were spotted and began taking fire from the enemy force locked inside. Smith and the other men rushed through the enemy fire and forced their way into the cabin. Before they could start shooting the confederate soldiers surrendered and were taken back to Union lines as prisoners. For their actions during this incident, all six men received the Medal of Honor.

Incarceration at Andersonville prison
On May 31, 1864, Smith was transferred to Company E, 191st Pennsylvania Infantry. Corporal Smith was captured August 19, 1864 by Confederate forces at Weldon Railroad, Virginia and sent to Andersonville prison.

Life in Anderson prison was hard with inadequate water supply, overcrowding, reductions of food rations and unsanitary conditions causing the deaths of nearly 13, 000 union troops. The prison had a 15-foot (4.6 m) high stockade to hold the approximately 45, 000 Union prisoners that were sent there and it was commanded by Major Henry Wirz, who, after the war, was tried and executed for murder and violations of the laws of war. The 16.5-acre prison was built in February 1864 and then enlarged to 26.5 acres in June 1864 shortly before Smith arrived. By the time Smith arrived, in August 1864, Andersonville held 33,000 prisoners, the most it held at one time during the course of its existence.
Although he managed to escape once, he was recaptured and returned to Andersonville where he remained a prisoner of war for the next seven months until he was freed by Union forces on March 2, 1865.

Two months later Smith was released from military service.

Later life
After the war Smith returned to Pennsylvania where he met and married his wife Joanna C. Hinkel and together they had a daughter they named Blanche.

He died March 14, 1933, in Port Townsend, Washington and is buried in Laurel Grove Cemetery. His grave can be found in the GAR section, block 198.

Medal of Honor citation

See also
List of American Civil War Medal of Honor recipients: Q–S
List of Medal of Honor recipients for the Battle of Gettysburg

References

External links
Medal of Honor website

1847 births
1933 deaths
People of Pennsylvania in the American Civil War
People from Cumberland County, Pennsylvania
American Civil War recipients of the Medal of Honor
Union Army non-commissioned officers
People from Port Townsend, Washington